Pseudotalopia sakuraii is a species of sea snail, a marine gastropod mollusk in the family Trochidae, the top snails.

Description
The size of the shell varies between 10 mm and 25 mm.

Distribution
This marine species occurs off Japan and the Philippines.

References

External links
 To Encyclopedia of Life
 To World Register of Marine Species
 

sakuraii
Gastropods described in 1961